Steiroxys is a genus of shield-backed katydids in the family Tettigoniidae.

Species
These four species belong to the genus Steiroxys:
 Steiroxys borealis Scudder, 1894
 Steiroxys pallidipalpus (Thomas, 1872) (steiroxys pallidipennis)
 Steiroxys strepens Fulton, 1930 (noisy shieldback)
 Steiroxys trilineata (Thomas, C., 1870) (three-lined shieldback)

References

Further reading

 
 
 

Tettigoniinae